Léon Germain Pelouse (1 October 1838 – 31 July 1891) was a self-taught French painter born in Pierrelaye (Val-d'Oise, France). At sixteen, he began working as a traveling salesman. He began painting when he was twenty, as he was serving in the French army as a conscript. His professional painting career began at twenty-seven, with the exhibition of his Les Environs de Précy (Near Précy) at the Salon de Paris of 1865. Despite severe criticism, he continued painting. He moved to Brittany, and there, inspired by nature around Pont-Aven and Rochefort-en-Terre, Pelouse painted landscapes which were exhibited at the Salon de Paris in the following years. He received his first medal in 1873 for Vallée de Cernay (Cernay Valley). He finally gained success and critical approval. The French government bought many of his works which are now in the holdings of museums including the Musée d'Orsay, the Musée Malraux, and the Musée des Beaux-Arts de Nantes.

By his adoption of his wife's son, Lucien Jean Léon Raingo-Pelouse, he was the grandfather of the French artist  (1893-1963; their lifespans did not overlap).

References

Further reading 
Champlin, John Denison. Cyclopedia of painters and paintings, New York: Scribner, 1892.
de Lassus, Priscille. "Pelouse, Chef de File" in Vallée de Chevreuse: le Petit Moulin des Vaux de Cernay, L'Object d'Art Hors-Série no. 106, Dijon: Éditions Faton, Sept. 2016, pp. 40–43.
Dutat, Dimitri. "La colonie de Cernay, trois générations d’artistes" in Vallée de Chevreuse: le Petit Moulin des Vaux de Cernay, L'Object d'Art Hors-Série no. 106, Dijon: Éditions Faton, Sept. 2016, pp. 20–27.
Fresneau, Estelle. Pont-Aven : du paysage à l'œuvre, Pont-Aven: Musée de Pont-Aven, 2007.
Grand Palais. Le Musee du Luxembourg en 1874. Peintures, Paris: Grand Palais, 1974.
Harambourg, Lydia. Cernay, une étape pour les paysagistes de Barbizon, catalogue on the exposition at the Centre Culturel Léon-Germain Pelouse de Cernay-la-Ville, 1997.
Levesque, Patrick and Stéphan, Édouard. Léon Germain Pelouse, 1838-1891, Catalogue Raisonné, Cernay-la-Ville: Chez l'Auteur, 2005.
Schubert, Philippe and Schubert, France. Les peintres de la Vallée de Chevreuse, Paris:  Éditions de l’Amateur, 2001.

External links
 Léon Germain Pelouse at cernaylaville.fr

1838 births
1891 deaths
French landscape painters
19th-century French painters